John A. Nephew is an American game designer, who has worked primarily on role-playing games.

Career
John Nephew began freelancing for TSR as a Dungeons & Dragons author in 1986 while he was still in high school, first writing material for Dragon and Dungeon magazines. While writing for the magazines, Nephew was invited to contribute to projects such as Kara-Tur: The Eastern Realms (1988), Castle Greyhawk (1988), and then his first solo book, Tall Tales of the Wee Folk (1989). Nephew went to Carleton College in Minnesota, where he met the team from Lion Rampant. Jonathan Tweet and Mark Rein Hagen founded Lion Rampant in 1987 while they were attending Carleton's traditional rival St. Olaf College, and Nephew was one of the Minnesota locals who joined the company later. Nephew joined the company in 1988, and his roles at the company during his tenure included acquisitions director, editor, and briefly president.

Nephew left Lion Rampant in 1990 when the company moved to Georgia as he did not want to leave Minnesota. He had purchased a photocopier for Lion Rampant to use, and struck a deal with the company when they moved that allowed them to keep the photocopier, while they gave Nephew a license to publish supplements for Ars Magica; Nephew then founded Atlas Games with help from friends from Lion Rampant such as Nicole Lindroos and Darin Eblom. In addition to supplements for Ars Magica, Underground, and Cyberpunk, Nephew published Tweet's Over the Edge and supplements, including Wildest Dreams which first brought together Robin Laws, Greg Stolze, and John Tynes near the beginnings of their careers in the RPG industry.

Nephew and Jonathan Tweet designed On the Edge (1994), a collectible card game based on Tweet's role-playing game Over the Edge. When the CCG industry crashed in 1996, Atlas was forced to lay off all the staff other than Nephew and Jeff Tidball to pay the final printing bills for On the Edge. Wizards of the Coast shut down its RPG lines in 1995 and put their games lines up for bid, so Atlas Games made an offer for Everway and Ars Magica; on February 12, 1996, Nephew withdrew the bid for Everway and on March 6, Wizards announced that it had sold Ars Magica to Atlas Games. In addition to his major roles, managing Atlas Games and editing its publications, Nephew wrote supplements for Ars Magica, Over the Edge, and d20 over the next few years.

Personal life
Nephew won a seat on the Maplewood, Minnesota City Council in 2007.  His wife Michelle Nephew gave birth to twins in 2009.

References

External links
 
 John Nephew's blog

Atlas Games people
Carleton College alumni
Dungeons & Dragons game designers
Living people
People from Maplewood, Minnesota
Year of birth missing (living people)